Gonbad-e Sorkh (also known as Gonbad-e Sorkhī and Gonbad Sorkhī) is a village in Shamil Rural District, Takht District, Bandar Abbas County, Hormozgan Province, Iran. At the 2006 census, its population was 46, in 14 families.

References 

Populated places in Bandar Abbas County